Water police, also called harbor patrols, port police, marine/maritime police, nautical patrols, bay constables, river police, or maritime law enforcement or coastal police are police officers, usually a department of a larger police organization, who patrol in water craft. Their patrol areas may be coastal sea waters, rivers, estuaries, harbors, lakes, canals or a combination of these.

Duties and functions 
Water police are usually responsible for ensuring the safety of water users, enforcing laws relating to water traffic, preventing crime on vessels, banks and shores, providing search and rescue services (either as the main provider or as an initial response unit before more specialized units arrive), and allowing the police to reach locations not easily accessible from land. They may also be responsible for coastal security, environmental law enforcement, immigration and smuggling patrols, and diving search operations (although many police organizations have separate units to handle this). Their operations may coordinate with other agencies with similar assets such as in the United States the various Federal, State or Local authorities may work together to promote or achieve similar enforcement or rescue outcomes.  In the United States, a number of states have combined the duties of water police with those of conservation officers.
Equipment ranges from personal water craft and inflatable boats to large seagoing craft, but most police vessels are small to medium, fast motorboats. In some areas these vessels incorporate a firefighting capability through a fixed deck nozzle. The operators of these vessels are generally trained in many rescue disciplines including first aid, vessel dewatering, and firefighting. They may also be rescue and scuba divers who are specially trained and also boat operators who may engage in towing operations.

List of water police units 
 
Australian Federal Police Water Police
New South Wales Police Marine Area Command
Northern Territory Police Marine and Fisheries Enforcement Unit
Queensland Police Water Police
South Australia Police Water Operations Unit
Tasmania Police Marine and Rescue Services
Victoria Police Water Police Squad
Western Australia Police Water Police Branch
 
Federal Police (Austria) Water Police of Austria (especially Vienna)
 
Royal Bahamas Police Force Harbour Patrol

Belgian Federal Police Water Police Branch (DAC)

Bermuda Police Marine Unit
 
Barrie Police Service Marine Unit
Brockville Police Service Marine Patrol Unit
Durham Regional Police Service Marine Unit
Halifax Regional Police Lake Patrol
Hamilton Police Service
Halton Regional Police  Marine Unit
London Police Service Marine Patrol Unit
Montreal City Police Service Nautical Patrol
Niagara Regional Police Service Marine Unit
Ontario Provincial Police – regional Marine Units and Underwater Search and Recovery Unit
Ottawa Police Service Marine/Underwater Unit
Peel Regional Police Marine Unit
Regina Police Service Underwater Investigation and Recovery Team
Royal Canadian Mounted Police West Coast Marine Detachment
Saskatoon Police Service River Patrol Detail
Toronto Police Service Marine Unit – formed in 1982 to replace Toronto Harbour Commission Port Police and Harbour Police units.
Vancouver Police Department Marine Squad
Victoria Police Department Marine Unit
Winnipeg Police Service River Patrol and Underwater Search and Recovery Unit
York Regional Police Service Marine Unit
 Cayman Islands
Royal Cayman Islands Police Marine Section
 
Helsinki Police Department Boat Unit
 
Maritime Gendarmerie
 
Federal Police units embedded within the Coast Guard
Water Protection Police units of the following State Police:
Baden-Württemberg Police
Bavarian State Police
Berlin Police
Brandenburg Police
Bremen Police
Hamburg Police
Hesse State Police
Lower Saxony Police
Mecklenburg-Vorpommern Police
North Rhine-Westphalia Police
Rhineland-Palatinate Police
Saarland Police
Saxony Police
Saxony-Anhalt Police
Schleswig-Holstein Police

Marine Police Unit
 
Gibraltar Services Police Marine Unit – a civil police force which guards and enforces law on UK Ministry of Defence installations in Gibraltar.
Royal Gibraltar Police Marine Section

Hellenic Coast Guard, whose full name is "Harbour Corps-Hellenic Coast Guard," was originally founded in 1919 as the "Harbour Corps" to act as Greece's maritime and harbour police. It still performs this role, and it is often referred to as the "Harbour [Corps]" (Λιμενικό) in everyday Greek parlance.
 
Hong Kong Police Force Marine Region – The Marine Police patrol  of waters within the territory of Hong Kong, including 263 islands. The Marine Region with about 3,000 officers, and a fleet of 143 in total, made up of 71 launches and 72 craft is the largest of any civil police force. Was referred to as Water Police until 1948 when it was renamed Marine Police.

 
Indonesian National Police – Polisi Perairan (POLAIR)
 
Kerala Coastal Police, coastal security division of Kerala State Police
 
Garda Síochána Water Unit
 
Israeli Police Marine Police
 
Corps of the Port Captaincies – Coast Guard Maritime police
Guardia di Finanza Marine Police Section
 
Jamaica Constabulary Force Marine Division
 
Royal Malaysian Police Marine Operations Force
 Marshall Islands
Kwajalein Police Department Marine Police Section
 
Monaco Police Force Marine Division
 
 Dienst Waterpolitie, water police force, a subdivision of the "Landelijke Eenheid" (LE), the nationwide unit.
 
New Zealand Police Maritime Policing Unit
 
National Aeronaval Service
 
Philippine National Police
Philippine National Police Maritime Group
 
Polícia Marítima Maritime Police
Republican National Guard (Portugal) Unidade de Controlo Costeiro (Coast Control Unit)
 
Police of Russia's Water Police
Saint Petersburg Police's river police
Moscow Police's river police
FSB's Russian Coast Guard
National Guard Maritime Unit
 
Police of Serbia's River Police
 
Singapore Police Force Police Coast Guard
 
Guardia Civil Guardia Civil del Mar
Servicio de Vigilancia Aduanera (Customs)
 
Sri Lanka Police Service Marine Division
 
South African Police Service Water Wing
 
Devon and Cornwall Constabulary Marine Operations Section
Dyfed-Powys Police Marine Unit
Dorset Police Marine Section
Essex Police Marine and Diving Unit
Hampshire Constabulary Marine Unit
Kent Police Marine Unit
Lothian and Borders Police Marine Section
Metropolitan Police Marine Policing Unit (formerly Thames Division)
Ministry of Defence Police Marine Unit
Norfolk Constabulary Broads policing unit by boat with support from 'Broads beat' officers on land
Northumbria Police Marine Unit
North West Police Underwater Search & Marine Unit
Police Scotland Dive and Marine Unit
 
Alabama Department of Conservation and Natural Resources Marine Police Division
Anacortes Police Department Marine Patrol, Washington
Austin Park Police, Texas
Town of Babylon Public Safety Department Marine Patrols/Bay Constables, New York
Baltimore Police Department Marine Unit, Maryland
Baltimore County Police Department Marine Unit, Maryland
Barnstable Police Department Marine Division, Massachusetts
Boston Police Department Harbor Unit, Massachusetts
Boynton Beach Police Department Marine Patrol, Florida
Butler County Sheriff's Office Marine Patrol, Ohio
Catawba County Sheriff's Office Lake Patrol Unit,
Charleston Police Department Harbor Patrol, South Carolina
Charlotte-Mecklenburg Police Department Lakes Enforcement Division, North Carolina
Chatham County Police Department Marine Patrol Unit, Georgia
Chicago Police Department Marine Unit, Illinois
Colchester Police Department Marine Unit, Colchester, Vermont
Cornelius Police Department Lake Patrol Unit Cornelius, North Carolina
Dane County Sheriff's Office Marine Patrol Division, Wisconsin
Daytona Beach Police Department Marine Unit, Florida
Delaware River and Bay Authority Police Department Marine Unit
Des Moines Police Department Waterway Operations Unit, Iowa
Detroit Police Department Harbor Master Unit, Michigan
Dover Police Department Marine Patrol Section, Delaware
East Bay Regional Park District Police Department Marine Patrol Unit, California
El Dorado County Sheriff's Office Boat Patrol, California
Erie County Sheriff's Office Marine Patrol Unit, New York
Evans Police Department Marine Rescue and Recovery Unit, New York
Florida Department of Environmental Protection Bureau of Park Patrol
Fort Lauderdale Police Department Marine Unit, Florida
Gaston County Police Department Marine Enforcement Division, North Carolina
Greenwich Police Department Marine Operations Section, Connecticut
Hamilton County Sheriff's Office Marine Patrol Unit, Ohio
Hamilton County Sheriff's Office Marine Division, Tennessee
Hennepin County, Minnesota Sheriff's Office Water Patrol, Hennepin County, Minnesota
Henrico County Division of Police Marine Patrol, Virginia
Henry County Sheriff's Office Marine Patrol Division, Ohio
Hollywood Police Department Marine Unit, Florida
Huron Police Department Harbor Patrol,
Huntington Harbormasters Office /Marine Patrol
Town of Islip Harbor Police, New York
Kent Police Department Marine Patrol Unit, Washington
Kentucky Department of Fish and Wildlife Resources Water Patrol
Key West Police Department Marine Unit, Florida
King County Sheriff's Office Marine/Dive Unit, Washington
Kern County Parks and Recreation Lake Patrol, California
Lake County Sheriff's Office Marine Unit, Florida
Lake County Sheriff's Office Marine Unit, Illinois
Lake County Sheriff's Department Marine Unit, Indiana
Lake County Sheriff's Office Marine Patrol, Ohio
Levee District Police, Louisiana
Lorain Port Authority Marine Patrol, Ohio
Los Angeles Port Police, Port of Los Angeles, California
Ludington Marine Patrol (jointly operated by city police and fire departments), Michigan
Macomb County Sheriff's Office Marine Division, Michigan
Maine Department of Marine Resources Marine Patrol
Maricopa County Sheriff's Office Lake Patrol Division, Arizona
Marin County Sheriff's Office Marine Patrol, California
Maryland Natural Resources Police
Maryland Transportation Authority Police Department Marine Unit
Massachusetts Environmental Police
Massachusetts State Police Marine Unit
Metropolitan District Commission Police Department, Connecticut
Metropolitan Police Department Harbor Patrol, District of Columbia
Miami-Dade Police Department Marine Patrol, Florida
Michigan Department of Natural Resources Law Enforcement Division, Marine Patrol
Milwaukee Police Department Harbor Patrol Unit, Wisconsin
Missouri State Water Patrol Department of Public Safety, Jefferson City, Missouri
Muskegon County Sheriff's Office Marine Division, Michigan
Nassau County Police Department Marine Division, New York
New Hampshire Marine Patrol Department of Safety
New Jersey State Police Marine Services Unit
New York City Police Department Harbor Unit, New York
New York City Police Department Auxiliary Police Harbor Unit, New York
New York State Police Marine Detail
North Miami Police Department Marine Patrol, Florida
North Miami Beach Police Department Marine Patrol, Florida
Oakland County Sheriff's Office Marine Unit, Michigan
Ohio Department of Natural Resources Division of Watercraft
Oklahoma City Police Department Lake Patrol Section, Oklahoma
Oklahoma Highway Patrol Lake Patrol Section (Troop W)
Olympia Police Department Harbor Patrol, Washington
Orlando Police Department Marine Patrol Unit, Florida
Ottawa County Sheriff's Office Marine Division, Michigan
Perrysburg Township Police Department Marine Patrol, Ohio
Philadelphia Police Department Marine Unit, Pennsylvania
Pittsburgh Bureau of Police River Rescue Unit, Pennsylvania (operated jointly with the city's Bureau of Emergency Medical Services and featured in the movie Striking Distance)
Placer County Sheriff's Office Marine Unit, California
Polk County Sheriff's Office Marine Unit, Florida
Port Authority of New York and New Jersey Police Department, Port Authority of New York and New Jersey
Port of New Orleans Harbor Police Department Patrol Boat Division, Louisiana
Poulsbo Police Department Marine Patrol, Washington
Providence Police Department Harbor Patrol, Rhode Island
Putnam County Sheriff's Office Marine Unit, New York
Rocky River Police Department Marine Patrol, Ohio
Ross County Sheriff's Office Marine Patrol Unit, Ohio
Sacramento County Sheriff's Department Marine Enforcement Detail, California
Sacramento Police Department Marine Division, California
San Diego Harbor Police Department Public Safety Agency California
Sandusky Police Department Marine Patrol, Ohio
Santa Barbara County Sheriff's Office Marine Unit, California
Seattle Police Department Harbor Patrol, Washington
Suffolk County Police Department Marine Bureau, New York
Suffolk County Sheriff's Office Marine Unit, New York
Summit County Sheriff's Office Marine Patrol, Ohio
Tampa Police Department Marine Unit, Florida
Toledo Police Department Harbor Patrol, Ohio
United States Coast Guard Search and Rescue (SAR) and Law Enforcement Detachments (LEDETS)
United States Customs and Border Protection: Office of Air and Marine
United States Park Police Marine Unit
Vermilion Police Department Marine Patrol Unit, Ohio
Virginia Marine Resources Commission Law Enforcement Division
Vermont State Police Marine Division Vermont
Wayne County Sheriff's Office Marine Division, Michigan
Webster Police Department Marine Patrol, Massachusetts
Wisconsin Department of Natural Resources Lakes Patrol Unit
 
 Ministry of Public Security: Vietnam People's Public Security
 Department of Traffic Police: Vietnam Traffic Police
 Bureau of Water Traffic Patrol and Control: Vietnam River Police
 Bureau of Water Criminal Investigation: Vietnam River Police
 River Squadron I
 River Squadron II
 River Squadron III

Gallery

See also 
Coast guard
Police watercraft
Water Rats, Australian television series about water police

References

External links 

Dyfed-Powys Police Marine Unit
Hampshire Police Marine Support Unit

Law enforcement
Law enforcement units